James Kwaku Boadu (born January 24, 1985, in Tafo) is a Ghanaian footballer who currently plays for New Edubiase United.

Career
He is a young striker and has represented Ghana at youth level. He previously played for Berekum Arsenal before he moved  to Kessben F.C. in 2007, at youth level he played for Champions FC. In summer of 2008 he transferred to the Turkish club, Gençlerbirliği S.K. After playing last season with Hacettepe Spor Kulübü on loan from Gençlerbirliği S.K.

KS Vllaznia
It was reported that Boadu will return to Turkey and play for Genclerbirligi or Trabzonspor, who showed a lot of interest in the players services, but Boadu was happy to stay in Albania and keep playing on for Vllaznia.

Ghana
Boadu turned in summer 2009 back to his former club Kessben F.C., who scored in his debut game on 19 October 2009 against King Faisal Babes the second goal.

References

External links
Kessben Profile

1985 births
Living people
Ghanaian footballers
Ghanaian expatriate footballers
Süper Lig players
Expatriate footballers in Turkey
Expatriate footballers in Albania
Berekum Arsenal players
Medeama SC players
KF Vllaznia Shkodër players
Gençlerbirliği S.K. footballers
Association football forwards
New Edubiase United F.C. players